The district of Sevenoaks, one of 13 local government districts in the English county of Kent, has nearly 120 current and former places of worship.  The town of Sevenoaks, the administrative centre of the area, has many of these—from its ancient Anglican parish church to Victorian chapels and 20th-century meeting places for various Christian denominations.  Smaller towns such as Edenbridge, Swanley and Westerham are also well provided with places of worship; and the mostly rural district's villages and hamlets have many of their own, covering a wide variety of ages, architectural styles and denominations. 89 places of worship are in use in the district and a further 28 former churches and chapels no longer hold religious services but survive in alternative uses.

Census results show that Christianity is followed by a majority of the district's residents.  Nearly 50 Anglican churches currently serve the Church of England, the country's Established Church.  Roman Catholics and worshippers affiliated with various Protestant Nonconformist, Pentecostal and other Christian denominations are accommodated in a variety of mostly 19th- and 20th-century chapels and meeting rooms: Baptists, Methodists and the United Reformed Church each maintain several congregations, there are seven Roman Catholic churches, and smaller groups such as the Open Brethren, Christian Scientists and Jehovah's Witnesses can also be found in the district.

English Heritage has awarded listed status to 48 places of worship in the district of Sevenoaks.  A building is defined as "listed" when it is placed on a statutory register of buildings of "special architectural or historic interest" in accordance with the Planning (Listed Buildings and Conservation Areas) Act 1990.  The Department for Culture, Media and Sport, a Government department, is responsible for this; English Heritage, a non-departmental public body, acts as an agency of the department to administer the process and advise the department on relevant issues.  There are three grades of listing status. Grade I, the highest, is defined as being of "exceptional interest"; Grade II* is used for "particularly important buildings of more than special interest"; and Grade II, the lowest, is used for buildings of "special interest".  As of February 2001, there were 23 Grade I-listed buildings, 85 with Grade II* status and 1,481 Grade II-listed buildings in the district.

Overview of the district and its places of worship

Clockwise from the north, it shares borders with four other boroughs in Kent—Dartford, Gravesham, Tonbridge and Malling and Tunbridge Wells—then with the district of Wealden in East Sussex, the district of Tandridge in Surrey, and the London Boroughs of Bromley and Bexley. The population at the time of the United Kingdom Census 2001 was 109,305. Sevenoaks itself, a commuter town with a population of about 18,500, is the largest settlement and the seat of local government; Swanley and Edenbridge are also major centres of population, with populations of 16,588 and 7,808 respectively as of 2001.

Sevenoaks town and its environs grew rapidly during the Victorian era.  The ancient parish church of St Nicholas was supplemented by Decimus Burton's St Mary's Church (1831) at Riverhead, St John's Church (1858–59) and St Mary's Church at Kippington (1878–80).  The Roman Catholic church dates from 1896.  For Nonconformists, a General Baptist chapel was erected in 1842, the original Wesleyan Methodist church opened in 1852, the large Congregational church at St John's Hill was finished in 1866 and Bible Christian and Baptist chapels were added in 1882 and 1886 respectively.

Religious affiliation
According to the United Kingdom Census 2001, 109,305 people lived in the district of Sevenoaks.  Of these, 77.02% identified themselves as Christian, 0.34% were Muslim, 0.2% were Hindu, 0.2% were Buddhist, 0.15% were Jewish, 0.09% were Sikh, 0.27% followed another religion, 14.43% claimed no religious affiliation and 7.3% did not state their religion.  The proportion of Christians was much higher than the 71.74% in England as a whole.  Adherents of Islam, Hinduism, Judaism and Sikhism and Buddhism were much less prevalent in the district than in England overall: in 2001, 3.1% of people in England were Muslim, 1.11% were Hindu, 0.67% were Sikh, 0.52% were Jewish and 0.28% were Buddhist.  The proportion of people who followed religions not mentioned in the Census was slightly lower than the national figure of 0.29%, as was the proportion of people with no religious affiliation (for which the national average was 14.59%).

Administration

Anglican churches
All but one of Sevenoaks district's Anglican churches are administered by the Diocese of Rochester, the seat of which is Rochester Cathedral.  The single exception is St Mary Magdalene's Church at Cowden, which is part of the Diocese of Chichester.  Within that area, it is part of the Archdeaconry of Horsham and the Deanery of East Grinstead.

The Diocese of Rochester has three archdeaconries—Bexley & Bromley, Rochester and Tonbridge—each of which are further subdivided into deaneries.  The church at Well Hill is in the Orpington Deanery of Bexley & Bromley Archdeaconry.  The Rochester archdeaconry administers the churches at Ash, Fawkham, Hartley (two churches) and Ridley, which are in the Cobham deanery, and those at Crockenhill, Hextable, Horton Kirby and Swanley (two churches) within the Dartford deanery.  All others are in the Tonbridge archdeaconry, in one of three deaneries.  The Sevenoaks deanery covers the churches at Brasted, Chevening, Chipstead, Halstead, Ide Hill, Kippington, Knockholt, Riverhead, Seal, Seal Chart, Sevenoaks Weald, Sundridge, Underriver, Westerham and the three in Sevenoaks town.  Eynsford, Farningham, Kemsing, Lullingstone, Otford, Shoreham, West Kingsdown and Woodlands are covered by the Shoreham deanery.  The Tonbridge deanery administers the churches at Chiddingstone, Chiddingstone Causeway, Edenbridge, Fordcombe, Four Elms, Hever, Leigh, Markbeech, Penshurst, Poundsbridge and Toys Hill.

Roman Catholic churches
The seven Roman Catholic churches in the borough—at Edenbridge, Hartley, Otford, Sevenoaks, Swanley, Westerham and West Kingsdown—are in the Archdiocese of Southwark, the seat of which is St George's Cathedral in Southwark, southeast London.  The archdiocese has 20 deaneries, of which seven are in Kent.  The churches at Hartley and Swanley are in the Gravesend deanery.  Those at Edenbridge, Sevenoaks and Westerham are in the Tunbridge Wells deanery, as are the Otford and West Kingsdown churches because they are within the four-church Roman Catholic parish of Sevenoaks.

Other denominations
About 150 Baptist churches in southeast England are part of the South Eastern Baptist Association, which arranges its member congregations into geographical networks.  West Kingsdown Baptist Church is part of the North Kent Network, while the Baptist churches in Bessels Green, Edenbridge, Eynsford and Sevenoaks are in the Tonbridge Network.  The Westerham Evangelical Congregational Church, while not formally a Baptist place of worship, also maintains links with this network.

As of 2010, The Drive Methodist Church in Sevenoaks, Otford Methodist Church and Sevenoaks Weald Methodist Church were part of the Sevenoaks Methodist Circuit within that denomination's South East District.

Crockenhill Baptist Church and Otford Evangelical Free Church are members of the Fellowship of Independent Evangelical Churches (FIEC), a pastoral and administrative network of about 500 churches with an evangelical outlook, and of Affinity (formerly the British Evangelical Council)—a network of conservative Evangelical congregations throughout Great Britain.  Westerham Evangelical Congregational Church is also affiliated with this group and with the Evangelical Fellowship of Congregational Churches, a fellowship of independent Congregational churches.  Churches belonging to various denominations are affiliated with the Evangelical Alliance.  These are the Vine Baptist Church, Vine Evangelical Church and Sevenoaks Town Church in Sevenoaks, the Bessels Green Baptist Church, the Baptist church and Kings Church in West Kingsdown, the Revelation Church at Ash Chapel in New Ash Green, Swanley Full Gospel Church, and St Peter's Anglican church at Hextable.

Dunton Green Free Church is part of the 34-church South-East Area of the Congregational Federation, an association of 294 independent Congregational churches in Great Britain.  The federation came into existence in 1972 when the Congregational Church in England and Wales merged with several other denominations to form the United Reformed Church.  Certain congregations wanted to remain independent of this and joined the Congregational Federation instead.

Current places of worship

Former places of worship

References

Notes

Bibliography

Sevenoaks
Sevenoaks
Sevenoaks
Churches
Sevenoaks places of worship